Badlesmere may refer to:

Places
Badlesmere, Kent, a village and civil parish in the Swale district of Kent, England

People
 Baron Badlesmere, abeyant barony in the Peerage of England
 Bartholomew de Badlesmere, 1st Baron Badlesmere (12751322), English soldier, Member of Parliament, landowner and nobleman
 Giles de Badlesmere, 2nd Baron Badlesmere (13141338), English nobleman
 Elizabeth de Badlesmere, Countess of Northampton (13131356), English noblewoman, wife of two English noblemen
 Gunselm de Badlesmere ( 12321301), English Justice of Chester and Cheshire
 Margaret de Clare, Baroness Badlesmere (12871333 or 1334), Norman-Irish noblewoman
 Maud de Badlesmere, Countess of Oxford (13101366), English noblewoman